Edward Ignacy Szklarczyk (31 July 1941 – 26 April 2013) was a Polish middle-distance runner. He competed in the men's 3000 metres steeplechase at the 1964 Summer Olympics.

References

1941 births
2013 deaths
Athletes (track and field) at the 1964 Summer Olympics
Polish male middle-distance runners
Polish male steeplechase runners
Olympic athletes of Poland
Place of birth missing